Joan Maloof (born ) is an American environmental activist and author. She founded the Old-Growth Forest Network in 2012.

Maloof was raised in Delaware. Her father was a chemical engineer. She is the author of five books. Her first, Teaching the Trees, was published in 2005, and her second, Among the Ancients, in 2011. In 2017, she published The Living Forest with photographer Robert Llewellyn.

She is a professor emeritus at Salisbury University.

References

External links
 

Living people
1950s births
American women environmentalists
American women non-fiction writers